Swimmeret was the debut album of Espadrille, whose members were Alice Cohen (formerly of The Vels and Die Monster Die), instrumentalist Bill Miller, and drummer John Flack.

"Swimmeret" was issued in 2001 under the Spare Me Records label.

Track listing
"Pretty Monster"
"Fleur de Lis"
"Green Envy"
"Stand Clear"
"Bikini Girl"
"Wonder Wheel"

External links
[ All Music Guide's review of Swimmeret]

2001 albums